In computability theory, two disjoint sets of natural numbers are called computably inseparable or recursively inseparable if they cannot be "separated" with a computable set.  These sets arise in the study of computability theory itself, particularly in relation to Π classes. Computably inseparable sets also arise in the study of Gödel's incompleteness theorem.

Definition 

The natural numbers are the set .

If a pair of disjoint sets A and B has no computable separating set, then the two sets are computably inseparable.

Examples 

If A is a non-computable set, then A and its complement are computably inseparable. However, there are many examples of sets A and B that are disjoint, non-complementary, and computably inseparable.  Moreover, it is possible for A and B to be computably inseparable, disjoint, and computably enumerable. 
 Let φ be the standard indexing of the partial computable functions. Then the sets } and } are computably inseparable (William Gasarch1998, p. 1047).
 Let # be a standard Gödel numbering for the formulas of Peano arithmetic. Then the set } of provable formulas and the set } of refutable formulas are computably inseparable. The inseparability of the sets of provable and refutable formulas holds for many other formal theories of arithmetic (Smullyan 1958).

References 

 
 
 
 

Computability theory